Saxony (Sachsen) is a region for quality wine in Germany located in the German federal state of Saxony. The region is sometimes referred to  colloquially as the Elbtal (Elbe valley). It is situated along the Elbe river from the Pillnitz section of Dresden to the village of Diesbar-Seußlitz located north of Meissen. Together with the Saale-Unstrut wine region, Saxony is one of the northernmost wine regions in Europe and are the only two of Germany's 13 wine regions that are located in the former East Germany. After German reunification in 1990, the vineyard surface was expanded from 200 to 450 hectares with European Union subsidies, but in recent years the vineyard area has decreased.

History
The area of Saxony has a long winemaking tradition with evidence of viticulture in the region dating as far back as 1161 in Meissen.

Climate and geography
Located in southeastern Germany near the border with the Czech Republic, the region has a continental climate that is tempered somewhat by the Elbe. The granite and gneiss based soils of the area are similar to the Austrian Wachau wine region.

Grapes and wine
The majority of the wine production, around 90%, is in dry wine.

The most cultivated grape varieties, by area in 2008, were:

Impressions

References

Geography of Saxony
Wine regions of Germany